Fishers Hill is a CDP in Shenandoah County, Virginia, United States. Fishers Hill has a post office with ZIP code 22626, which opened on July 28, 1882.

The Snapp House was listed on the National Register of Historic Places in 1979.

References

Census-designated places in Shenandoah County, Virginia
Census-designated places in Virginia